Feodosiy Petsyna (6 April 1950 – 23 July 2010) was an archbishop in the Ukrainian Orthodox Church.

From 1994 to 2006, Petsyna was the Archbishop of Drohobych and Sambir in the Patriarchate of Kiev.  From 2007 until his death, he held the same title in the Ukrainian Autocephalous Orthodox Church.

External links
Obituary (in Ukrainian)

Bishops of the Ukrainian Orthodox Church of the Kyivan Patriarchate
Bishops of the Ukrainian Autocephalous Church
1950 births
2010 deaths
People from Boryslav